The 2019–20 season was Partick Thistle's second consecutive season in the Scottish Championship, having been relegated from the Scottish Premiership at the end of the 2017–18 season. Partick Thistle also competed in the League Cup, the Scottish Challenge Cup and the Scottish Cup. On 15 April, the SPFL voted to end the lower leagues in Scottish football due to the coronavirus pandemic and as a result Partick were relegated to League One after two years in the Championship, which the club decided not to take legal action against.

Season summary
Following a difficult start to the season, Gary Caldwell was sacked as manager on 18 September after eleven months in charge. At the time of Caldwell's departure, the club had recorded two draws and three losses in the first five games of the league campaign and sat ninth of the ten teams in the Scottish Championship. On 23 September, Ayr United manager Ian McCall was announced as Caldwell's successor for a second spell at Partick Thistle, having previously managed the club between 2007 and 2011. Alan Archibald, who had been dismissed as manager in October 2018 after five years in charge, also returned to the club as assistant manager, with former Ayr United midfielder Neil Scally also joining the coaching staff.

McCall's first game in charge was Partick Thistle's quarter-final match against Celtic in the Scottish League Cup on 25 September, which Celtic won 5–0. Three days later the club achieved its first league win of the season with a 3–1 victory over Inverness Caledonian Thistle, lifting them from the bottom of the Championship to ninth above Alloa Athletic. It was not until November that the team's first home win of the season was secured after a 2–1 victory over Greenock Morton, by which time the club had fallen back into last place.

In November EuroMillions lottery winner Colin Weir assumed overall control of the club after purchasing a majority of club's shares. Weir, who had won a £161 million jackpot in 2011 and had previously contributed £2 million to Partick Thistle, stated his intentions were to donate the majority stake to a fan group by the end of March 2020 to allow fan ownership of the club. Weir died after a short illness on 27 December, and was replaced by former chairman Jacqui Low in February 2020.

On 13 March 2020 all football in Scotland, including the Scottish Championship, was suspended until further notice due to the COVID-19 pandemic in the country. At the time of suspension Partick Thistle was in last place in the Scottish Championship, two points behind ninth-placed Queen of the South with one game fewer played. A proposal by the Scottish Professional Football League (SPFL) to end the season for all leagues prematurely in mid-April 2020, despite an objection from Dundee F.C., led Partick Thistle to announce a legal effort to overturn the decision. Following Dundee F.C.'s withdrawal of their objection and subsequent support for the SPFL's proposal, the club announced it would not pursue legal action due to the financial cost. With prize money and promotions and relegations decided on positions achieved at the time of suspension in March, Partick Thistle were therefore relegated from the Scottish Championship to League One, the first time the club had fallen to the third tier of Scottish football since 2006.

Competitions

Scottish Championship

Scottish League Cup

Group stage

Knockout round

Scottish Challenge Cup

Scottish Cup

Squad statistics

Appearances

 

|-
|colspan="12"|Players who left the club during the 2019–20 season
|-

|}

Club statistics

League table

League Cup table

Transfers

In

Out

Loans In

Loans Out

See also
 List of Partick Thistle F.C. seasons

References

Partick Thistle F.C. seasons
Partick Thistle